CISC Semiconductor GmbH defines itself as “design and consulting service company for industries developing embedded microelectronic systems with extremely short Time-To-Market cycles.” The company started in 1999, working in the semiconductor industry, but soon expanded its field towards the automotive branch and further extended business towards the radio frequency technology (RFID) sector in 2003. Since then, CISC gained significant experience and expertise in RFID, developing an own business segment and highly sensitive measurement equipment to test and verify RFID systems for different industries. Representatives of CISC Semiconductor are actively working on and contributing to worldwide standardization of future technologies like RFID, in different standardization organizations. This effort brings CISC into the position of being a leader in research and development, and thus being able to be “one step ahead of innovation”. As of 2011 CISC Semiconductor is in a globally leading standardization position for RFID testing by providing the convener of ISO/IEC JTC1 WG4/SG6 on “RFID performance and conformance test methods“, as well as GS1 EPCglobal co-chairs for performance and conformance tests.

Their main office is at the Lakeside Science & Technology Park in Klagenfurt, Austria near the University of Klagenfurt. A branch office is located in Graz, Austria, enabling a close cooperation with the Graz University of Technology. In the U.S.A the company has a subsidy in Mountain View (CA).

History 

CISC Semiconductor Design+Consulting GmbH was founded in 1999 as an R&D focused and 100% privately owned business by CEO Dr. Markus Pistauer in Klagenfurt, Austria.
Between 2000 and 2002 CISC was part of two international R&D <s: “High Quality Design in Deep Submicron Technology” and “Technology Driven Design and Test”.
In 2002 CISC opened an R&D center in Graz, Austria with the purpose of enabling a closer cooperation with the Institute for Technical Informatics at Graz University of Technology.
In 2003 CISC Semiconductor expanded its business towards radio frequency identification (RFID) and radio frequency (RF) communication, laying the foundation for its current activity in various standardization processes.
Getting further into RFID technology, CISC became a member of EPCglobal™ and started participating in RFID standardization work for the first time in 2004.
In 2004 CISC launched its product SyAD (System Architect Designer) and won an Austrian Innovation and Research Prize Award (Province Carinthia).
Since 2004 CISC is organized in three business units: Automotive (AT), RFID+RFComm (RF) and Tools+Methodology (TM).
CISC joined two European R&D projects: “Robust Design for Efficient Use of Nanometer Technologies” (ROBIN) and “Wireless Technologies for small area Networks with Embedded Security and Safety” (Witness), starting in 2004.
In 2006 CISC won a special economy prize on high innovative products (by Privatstiftung Kärntner Sparkasse, Austria) for its RFID Application and System Design Toolset (CISC RFID ASD Kit+Library), which was brought to the market in the same year, as well as another RF product: The CISC RFID Field Recorder.
From 2006 on CISC started providing expert training on RFID via the European EPC Competence Center.
In the year 2007 CISC launched products in all its three business units: AT (Automotive Bus System Lib and Automotive Core Lib), RF (Tag Emulator and MeETS), as well as TM (SyAD V2.0).
Furthermore, in 2007 CISC and its products were present at four continents: Europe, Asia, Africa and America, further extending the company's export efforts.
 In 2007 CISC joined the Open SystemC initiative and became certified Alliance Partner of National Instruments.
In January 2007 CISC opened its R&D branch office in Graz, Austria.
Two new research projects were started in 2008: “SR2 – Short Range Radio” and “TEODACS – Test, Evaluation and Optimization of Dependable Automotive Communication Systems” at the Virtual Vehicle Competence Center. Another one followed in 2009: “e3car” via the ENIAC Joint Undertaking, which was meant to push the development of hybrid and electrical vehicles.
In 2010 CISC pushed product development in the business units RF and TM, improving MeETS to achieve measurement sensitivities of UHF RFID tag performance measurements beyond -100dBm and releasing SyAD’s 3rd generation – SyAD 2010.
From 2010 on CISC Semiconductor is official industry partner of the Technical University of Munich joining their RFID AZM (RFID User Center Munich).
The international research project: “Process Oriented Electronic Control Units for Electric Vehicles Developed on a Multi-System Real-Time Embedded Platform” (POLLUX) under the umbrella of ARTEMIS Joint Undertaking started in 2010.
In 2011 the company's name was changed to CISC Semiconductor GmbH, eliminating the phrase “Design+Consulting” to better fit the current field of business.
In Spring 2012 CISC Semiconductor decided to adapt and change its logo to visualize the development that the company has gone through since its foundation in 1999.
The Company's new product - RFID Xplorer - was successfully launched in April and presented at the Euro ID trade fair in Berlin.

Main Markets 
CISC Semiconductor's main markets are situated in the Semiconductor, Automotive and RFID industry. Tools and techniques are designed for simulation based system development of embedded microelectronic systems, including RFID systems. The most important markets include:

EDA (Electronic Design Automation) – e.g. design and simulation frameworks
RFID (Radiofrequency Identification) – e.g. measurement and test equipment for tags, readers and systems

Competences 
The company's core competences are ranging from system design, modeling and simulation to verification and optimization of heterogeneous, embedded, microelectronic systems, with a particular focus on Automotive and RFID systems. CISC's versatile competences are reflected in their business units:

Automotive 
In terms of Automotive, CISC offers various tools and services related to microelectronic engineering work, assisting in development work by providing know-how and tools to support design engineers.

Wireless Identification 
In RFID and RF communication CISC's competences are covering experience in RFID product development, simulation tool development and RFID measurement systems as well as experience in evaluation, modelling, simulation and testing of RFID products and systems. Furthermore, CISC is experienced with RFID trainings and consulting and plays a leading role in RFID standardization (ISO/IEC, EPCglobal and ETSI).

Tools+Methodology 
Within the business unit Tools+Methodology, CISC works on system design, modeling, simulation,  verification and optimization of heterogeneous embedded microelectronic systems, as well as software engineering e.g. for the EDA industry.

Standardization 
CISC's history in standardization started in 2003 with the expansion of its business towards the wireless communication technology RFID (radiofrequency identification). With the development of a new business segment and several RFID measurement products, CISC representatives – especially Josef Preishuber-Pflügl – started to play an active role in international standardization. Since then, CISC has been actively participating in international RFID standardization processes (ISO, IEC, ETSI, ASI/ÖNORM) and is currently active member of EPCglobal and the LPRA (Low Power Radio Association).  CISC's input on standards and technology development ensures to keep technology in line by continuous development and change of regulatory constraints.

CISC is active member of several different standardization working groups, currently CISC provides the convener of ISO/IEC JTC1 SC31 WG4/SG6 responsible for performance and conformance measurements for RFID for item management, the project editor for ISO/IEC 18000-6 “UHF RFID air interface”, ISO/IEC 29167 “RFID security”, the convener of the Austrian AG 001.31, the national mirror committee of ISO/IEC JTC1 SC31, as well as the vice-chairmen to ETSI ERM TG34 responsible for RFID regulatory.

References 

Semiconductor companies of Austria
Electronics companies established in 1999
Austrian companies established in 1999
Economy of Carinthia (state)
Klagenfurt